Jesper Mattson Cruus af Edeby (1576–1622) was a Swedish soldier and politician, being appointed Privy Councilor in 1612, Field Marshal in 1615, Lord High Treasurer in 1615, and Governor of Riga in 1621. In the Kalmar War (1611–1613) he led the Swedish troops to victory against the Danish forces, led by King Christian IV of Denmark, at the Battle of Kölleryd, on 21 February 1612. In 1622 he died in Riga after being wounded in a dispute with a local clergyman.

References

 Cruus, Jesper Mattson at  Nationalencyklopedins Internettjänst (Swedish)

1576 births
1622 deaths
Field marshals of Sweden
Swedish nobility
Members of the Privy Council of Sweden
17th-century Swedish military personnel
Swedish-speaking Finns
17th-century Swedish politicians
People of the Kalmar War